Anxious Jongwe Masuka is a Zimbabwean politician and member of the Emmerson Mnangagwa cabinet. He was appointed to oversee the Ministry of Lands, Agriculture, Water and Rural Resettlement in August 2020 after the previous minister Perrance Shiri died.

Prior to entering politics, Masuka worked as the chief executive officer of the Zimbabwe Agricultural Society. Masuka has also worked as a lecturer at the University of Zimbabwe, at Zimbabwe's Forestry Commission and the Tobacco Research Board, where he was the general manager.

References

Zimbabwean politicians
Year of birth missing (living people)
Living people